Pythium debaryanum is a species of water mould in the family Pythiaceae. It is known as a plant pathogen on many kinds of wild and cultivated plants, including peanut, beet, eucalyptus, tobacco, and pine trees. The plants develop damping off, a disease state.

See also
 List of soybean diseases

References

External links
 Index Fungorum
 USDA ARS Fungal Database

debaryanum
Water mould plant pathogens and diseases
Tobacco diseases
Tomato diseases
Food plant pathogens and diseases
Soybean diseases